Sholes Glacier is located on the northeast slopes of Mount Baker in the North Cascades of the U.S. state of Washington. The glacier lies on the north side of the ridge known as The Portals. Between 1850 and 1950, Sholes Glacier retreated . During a cooler and wetter period from 1950 to 1979, the glacier advanced  but between 1980 and 2006 retreated back .

Sholes Glacier is named in honor of Charles H. Sholes, who served as president of the Mazamas in the early 1900s.

See also 
List of glaciers in the United States

References 

Glaciers of Mount Baker
Glaciers of Washington (state)